Luis-Mary was a Japanese visual kei post-punk band that was formed in 1989 and broke up in 1993. There were four members.

Members
Yoshitsugu "Zyeno" Yamashita (山下善次) - Guitar
Takehisa "Shien" Maruyama (丸山武久) - Bass
Takanori "Haine" Nishikawa (西川貴教) - Vocals
Ken Arita (有田賢) - Drums

Biography
Luis-Mary began in 1989 by Zyeno and Shien. Haine and Ken joined later in 1990. On January 23, 1991, they released their first single "Lainy Blue". Luis-Mary disbanded in 1993 and various "Best of" CDs were released subsequently. Takanori Nishikawa became very successful under his solo act, T.M.Revolution, and is currently in the band abingdon boys school, which formed in 2005. Yoshitsugu went on to join the band Nude along with Takehisa Maruyama. Following Nude, Yoshitsugu played in Cuve, then Sonic Smart Suzzy, and The Strawberry Gun-Gun. Takehisa moved on to play in the band Raydio.

Discography

Singles

Track list

References

External links
Discography
Luis-Mary at Last.fm

Visual kei musical groups
Japanese rock music groups
Musical groups established in 1989
Musical groups disestablished in 1993